is a public junior college in Kōchi, Kōchi, Japan. It was founded in 1953.

Departments
 Department of social sciences

See also
 List of junior colleges in Japan

References

External links
 

Japanese junior colleges
Universities and colleges in Kōchi Prefecture